Shumsk Raion was a former raion in Ternopil Oblast in western Ukraine. Its administrative center was Shumsk. The raion was abolished on 18 July 2020 as part of the administrative reform of Ukraine, which reduced the number of raions of Ternopil Oblast to three. The area of Shumsk Raion was merged into Kremenets Raion. The last estimate of the raion population was 

At the time of disestablishment, the raion consisted of two hromadas:
 Shumsk urban hromada with the administration in Shumsk;
 Velyki Dederkaly rural hromada with the administration in the selo of Velyki Dederkaly.

See also
 Subdivisions of Ukraine

References

Former raions of Ternopil Oblast
1940 establishments in Ukraine
Ukrainian raions abolished during the 2020 administrative reform